Kim Il-yeop (born February 15, 1980) is a South Korean professional baseball pitcher.

Kim was born in Daegu, South Korea. He had a minor league stint from 2001 to 2002 for the Philadelphia Phillies, playing for the Batavia Muckdogs and Lakewood BlueClaws. He was then released, and, in 2009, was hired by the Chiba Lotte Marines as a pitcher. After 2010, he was released, and is currently a free agent.

References

External links
Career statistics and player information from Korea Baseball Organization

1980 births
Living people
Batavia Muckdogs players
Lakewood BlueClaws players
Lotte Giants players
Hanwha Eagles players
Sportspeople from Daegu